Anil Jain is an Indian Surgeon and Political Leader. He was the National General Secretary of BJP and also in charge of BJP's Haryana and Chhattisgarh units. He is patron of Integrated Talent Development Mission (ITDM) 
 He was elected to Rajya Sabha, the upper house of the Indian Parliament, from Uttar Pradesh on 23 March 2018. He was elected as the President of the All India Tennis Association (AITA) for the tenure 2020 - 2024 .

Political career
Jain joined politics as an active member of Bhartiya Janata Party in 2001. His political career till date is as follows:
2001-2002: All India Joint Convener, Doctor Cell, BJP
2002-2007: All India Convener, Doctor Cell, BJP
2007-2013: Member, National Executive, BJP
Co-Incharge:
2007-2010 – Uttarakhand
2011-2013 – Jammu & Kashmir
2013–present: National Secretary, BJP
Co-inchrge : Haryana

References

External links

Living people
Rajya Sabha members from Uttar Pradesh
People from Firozabad
Bharatiya Janata Party politicians from Uttar Pradesh
Year of birth missing (living people)
Rajya Sabha members from the Bharatiya Janata Party